Geronimo is a 2014 French drama film directed by Tony Gatlif. It premiered in the Special Screenings section at the 2014 Cannes Film Festival on 20 May.

Cast
 Céline Sallette as Geronimo 
 Rachid Yous as Fazil 
 David Murgia as Lucky 
 Nailia Harzoune as Nil 
 Vincent Heneine as Antonieto
 Adrien Ruiz as El Piripi 
 Aksel Ustun as Kemal 
 Tim Seyfi as Tarik 
 Sébastien Houbani as Hassan 
 Finnegan Oldfield as Nikis Scorpion 
 Arthur Vandepoel as Alex  
 Maryne Cayon as Soda 
 Pierre Obradovic as Yougos
 Alexis Baginama Abusa as Yaxa 
 Sergi López as Geronimo's father

References

External links
 
 

2014 films
2014 drama films
French drama films
2010s French-language films
Films directed by Tony Gatlif
2010s French films